Jemursari Station (JMS) was a railway station located on the border of Jemur Wonosari and Gayungan.

Jemursari Station was one of the first railway stations in the city of Surabaya which was built in 2003–2004 during the launch of the Delta Ekspres service for the Surabaya–Sidoarjo connection. This railway station was inaugurated on 9 February 2004, in conjunction with the launch of the Delta Express by President Megawati Sukarnoputri. However, on 10 February 2021, the passenger service at this station was discontinued so that now not a single commuter train service stops at this station.

Services
Starting 10 February 2021 there will be no more passenger services at this station.

References

External links

Railway stations in Surabaya
Railway stations opened in 2004
Railway stations closed in 2021
Defunct railway stations in Indonesia
2004 establishments in Indonesia
2021 disestablishments in Indonesia